The canton of Grand Sud is an administrative division of the Corse-du-Sud department, southeastern France. It was created by the French canton reorganisation which came into effect in March 2015. Its seat is in Porto-Vecchio.

It consists of the following communes:

Bonifacio 
Carbini 
Figari 
Levie 
Monacia-d'Aullène 
Pianottoli-Caldarello 
Porto-Vecchio (partly)
Sotta

References

Cantons of Corse-du-Sud